Důl is a municipality and village in Pelhřimov District in the Vysočina Region of the Czech Republic. It has about 60 inhabitants.

Administrative parts
The village of Nová Ves is an administrative part of Důl.

References

Villages in Pelhřimov District